This is a list of film festivals in Taiwan.

Active festivals

Defunct

Film festivals

Taiwan
Taiwan
Film festivals